Euchrysops nandensis is a butterfly in the family Lycaenidae. It is found in Ethiopia, Kenya (the western part of the country and central highlands) and northern Tanzania. The habitat consists of grassy spots in savanna.

References

Butterflies described in 1904
Euchrysops